The Great Inimitable Mr. Dickens is a 1970 British television film about the life of Charles Dickens directed by Ned Sherrin and starring Anthony Hopkins, Jenny Agutter and Arthur Lowe. Hopkins performance as Dickens saw him nominated for the British Academy Television Award for Best Actor in 1971.

References

External links

1970 films
British television films
British biographical films
1970s biographical films
Works about Charles Dickens
1970s English-language films
1970s British films